A geocoin is a metal or wooden token minted in similar fashion to a medallion, token coin, military challenge coin or wooden nickel, for use in geocaching, specifically as form of a calling card.

Many of these are made to be trackable on various websites to be able to show the movement around the world and visitors to be able to leave comments when they find the coin. Each coin has a unique tracking ID, which can also be used when logging it to a designated website.

If the diameter is larger than  the geocoin is called macrocoin, and contains the saying of "that’s not a coin, it’s an anchor".

Signature items

Personal geocoins are a personal signature item that normally bears the geocacher's handle and personal design.

Geocoins are often minted by caching organizations and companies. Though not specifically a personal signature item they are a form of signature item for the organization that developed them. However, most are custom-made for geocachers, usually in batches of 100 pieces or less.

Reviewer/Moderator/Lackey Coins are another form of signature items over the years these have their own following. Many of them have taken the time to create their own signature item.

In the first few years the number of coins that were a signature item for a geocaching group, or individuals far outnumbered the coins that were made to sell. However now they tend to be smaller percentage as the industry has a number of coins manufacturers that develop coins for events, holidays, or special coins. The cost to make a personal coin is fairly high.

Tracking websites
When a cache listed at geocaching.com contains a geocoin, an icon (often unique to the type of the coin) is shown on the cache page's "Inventory" section. This icon will also appear in the inventory of any cacher holding one as well as in each cacher's historical trackable item listing. Icons will also remain in the inventory of cachers who log the 'discovery' of a geocoin's number without physically removing it from a cache. "Icon collecting" –  the act of having these icons listed in one's trackables listing –  is an associated hobby. Many people bring geocoins with unique icons to geocaching events so that others may see the coins and use the tracking number to collect the icons online, and it is not uncommon for collectors to activate some or all of the coins in their collections in order to have a matching online collection of icons associated with their geocaching.com accounts.

Other websites for trackable coins have included the 2002Canadian geocoin, Utah geocoin, Oregon State coin, and sigitem.com.

Free tracking service for coins and other items is available from Geokrety, with full service for geocaching sites such as opencaching.us, and partial service for other geocaching sites. An owner of geocoins can also set up his own website to monitor these moving mementos.

Theft
It is not uncommon for activated, released geocoins to go missing, whether because a cacher is unfamiliar with the logging and tracking process or due to outright theft. Some geocoin owners will purposefully attempt to destroy the resale value of the coin by drilling and tagging it with an extra tag, marker, or other item that is intended to underscore the fact that the geocoin is meant to travel, not to be kept. Another somewhat controversial anti-theft measure is to create a copy of the geocoin, releasing the copy and keeping the original.

In 2012, a geocoin helped authorities return stolen items to a geocaching enthusiast in Seattle, who marked the coins as missing online. The goods were found in a storage unit during a raid and the geocoins became instrumental in connecting the burglars to their crime.

History

September 30, 2001: The first trackable geocoin released was the Moun10Bike Version 1 Geocoin #002. The Moun10Bike Version 1 Geocoins are sought-after geocoins. They are all displayed on geocaching.com as owned by Moun10Bike and he has strictly forbidden their sale.
 March 2002: The first geocoin that was produced and sold to the public to collect and release was the Canadian geocoin.
 2003: The first USAGeocoin was released for sale, making it one of the first geocoins that one can buy, release, and track online without minting an exclusive personal design. The proposed 2002 design was never made.
 2005: Geocaching.com permitted any geocaching.com user to purchase tracking numbers for approved designs, fueling a sudden surge in number of coins. Minimum purchase was initially set at 1000 tracking numbers.
 Fall 2006: Groundspeak reduced the minimum purchase of tracking numbers, and the minimum number of coins minted to obtain a unique icon, to 250. The drop in the cost to create a geocoin with a unique icon fueled a 'geocoin craze' with hundreds of new personal, group and increasingly purely commercial designs minted.
 February 17, 2007: The First Annual Geocoinfest was held in Temecula, California, USA. This event brought hundreds of geocoin collectors together for the first time in a mass event, with many exclusive coins being given away or traded.
 Fall 2007: Geokrety.org began a free tracking service, Geokrety, for coins and other items, with full support for geocaching sites such as Opencaching.us and partial support for other geocaching sites.
 March 4, 2009: Geocaching.com further reduced the minimum number of codes for purchase to 50, and the minimum number of coins eligible for a custom icon to 50.

Notable Geocoins

First Geocoin: Moun10Bike Coin, September 30, 2001
First Geocoin for sale to public: Canada Geocoin Spring 2002
Largest Geocoin (production run): Generic Coin Ø5" (~120mm)
Smallest Geocoin (production run, trackable): Europe Nano, 2009, Ø0.5" (~12mm), 1mm thick
Largest Single Coin (not a production run, trackable): It was handcrafted in New York https://www.geocaching.com/track/details.aspx?id=230537
The Ginormous Geocoin is 46 inches in diameter, made of cast iron spray-painted GOLD, and weighs about 115 pounds. The geocoin code is engraved along its rim (the code consists of 4 letters, 1 number, followed by a final letter).
Second Single Coin (not a production run, trackable): It was handcrafted for the 2011 Geocaching mega event Geofarm in Switzerland. This giga coin was built after the official event geocoin featuring the event's mascot cow. The coin was auctioned on said event and is now in the hands of a geocacher in Switzerland.
Third Largest Single Coin (not a production run): It was handcrafted for the Geocaching event "Nordseetaufe 2010" in Germany. This macrocoin was built after the official event geocoin that has the shape of an anchor with a red and white rope. However it was not a run of a specific coins, but a coin that was made to resemble the coins that were made. It later had a coin number assigned to it. It remains the heaviest geocoin.

Coin finishes
Antique Finish: A finish applied to copper, gold, or silver to give it a darker look. This finish is used often to have the fine details in a coin stand out more clearly.
Foggy Painting: Paint finish simulating metal applied surface. Can have gloss, shine or lustre but lacking definition (foggy details).
Matte: see Satin Finish.
Misty: Silver or gold finish simulating effect of unpolished areas of a proof coin.
Proof-like: Effect attained on high quality die stuck coins by high pressure and multiple strikes producing mirror finish background with satin finish relief areas
Satin Finish: A finish giving a matte (non-glossy) look to the metal. A misused term as traditionally (in fabric) a satin finish often has a level of gloss associated with it.
Silver: 1. plated with silver 2. .999 solid silver 3. silver-like nickel-plated (shiny nickel).

Collecting terms
AE: Artist’s Edition: type of SE; a version of a retail commercial geocoin only made available to the designer of the coin.
LE: Limited Edition: Typically a different version (color, metal, etc.) than the main run of coins. Produced in a limited quantity one time only.
RE: Regular edition not produced in a limited in number thus may be reprised according to demand as dies are held by the mint for minimum of three years.
SE: Special Edition: Typically a different version to the main run of coins but unlike LE, XLE or XXLE no limit on the number minted, and they may be reminted at any time.
XLE: Extra Limited Edition: Same as LE only fewer.
XXLE: Extremely Limited Edition: Same as XLE only fewer.
HTF: Hard to Find; refers to ease of acquiring through purchase or trade not total mint numbers.
VHTF: Very Hard to Find; refers to ease of acquiring through purchase or trade not total mint numbers.
Proof Coin: 1. The sample coins provided by the mint. 2. Effect attained on high quality die stuck coins by high pressure and multiple strikes producing mirror finish background with satin finish relief areas.
Sample Coin: The sample coins provided by the mint. Most sample geocoins do not have tracking numbers or only dummy codes like XXXXXX.

Geocaching terms
Activated/Unactivated: Geocoins with tracking numbers that have been registered on their associated websites are said to be "activated", whereas geocoins that are still unregistered are termed "unactivated". Activated geocoins that have been left in a cache are meant to be moved from cache to cache like a Travel Bug, whereas unactivated geocoins may be placed in geocaches to be found by others and kept as trophies. Unactivated coins may be also traded or given to other cachers like a calling card, as prizes, as awards, or merely sold and collected.
Custom Icon: 16 x 16 px or 32 x 32 px GIF files that are associated to the coin or coin series by geocaching.com trackable coins.
Micro: A geocoin that is smaller than ~ in diameter. Generally recognized as a coin that would fit inside a 35mm film canister.
Non-trackable: A geocoin produced without a tracking number.
Personal: A geocoin produced or designed by an individual or team of geocachers featuring team or cacher's nickname ("geonick") prominently on the coin.

See also

 Geocaching
 Geokrety
 Travel Bug
 Where's George

References

Further reading

External links

Geocoins Information Page from Geocaching.com listing trackable geocoins
log4.us Oregon State coin and others
Geocoin Gallery Large geocoin picture database. Formerly geocoincollection.com

Geocaching
Token coins
Outdoor locating games
Internet object tracking
Numismatics
Exonumia